Hepatitis Monthly is a monthly peer-reviewed open access medical journal published by Kowsar Publishing, a publisher included on Beall's List prior to its shutdown in 2017. It was established in 2002 by Seyed-Moayed Alavian, who is the journal's editor-in-chief.

Abstracting and indexing
The journal is abstracted and indexed in CAB Abstracts, CINAHL, EBSCO databases, Embase, Science Citation Index Expanded, and Scopus. According to the Journal Citation Reports, the journal has a 2018 impact factor of 1.578. In August 2017, the United States National Library of Medicine, which manages the PubMed Central database, determined that the journal did not satisfy their Scientific Quality Standard, and delisted the journal.

References

External links
 

Publications established in 2002
Gastroenterology and hepatology journals
English-language journals
Monthly journals
Kowsar Publishing academic journals
Creative Commons Attribution-licensed journals